Spirotropis eurytima is a species of sea snail, a marine gastropod mollusk in the family Drilliidae.

Description
The length of the shell attains 16 mm.

Distribution
This species occurs in the demersal zone of the Gulf of Aden.

References

  Tucker, J.K. 2004 Catalog of recent and fossil turrids (Mollusca: Gastropoda). Zootaxa 682:1–1295

External links
 

eurytima
Gastropods described in 1998